Johan Bryde (June 1858 – May 1925) was a Norwegian businessperson, ship owner and whaler. He helped establish the first modern whaling station in the country of South Africa. The Bryde's whale (Balaenoptera brydei) is named after him.

Biography
Bryde was born at Laurvig in Vestfold, Norway.  He was the son of  Johan Maurits Bryde (1830–1899) and Karen Eriksen (1837–1914). He founded a shipping company at Sandefjord in 1890.  Whaling was the foremost business in Sandefjord.  

Later his cousin, Jacob Egeland (1864-1946) and Johan Bryde raised money to  start their first whaling station in Durban.  Egeland had arrived in  Durban during 1880 and had developed interests in shipping, fishing, timber, and whaling.  Their company was named 'The South African Whaling Company'.  From 1908 Bryde managed whaling out of Southern Africa. In 1909,  Jacob Egeland ended his partnership with Johan Bryde and started the Union Whaling and Fishing Company with another cousin Abraham E. Larsen.

Bryde is also known as owner of the  oil mill  Gimle Oljemølle and chemical factory Jotun Kemiske Fabrik at Gimle outside Sandefjord, both of which went bankrupt in 1925. The plants were purchased by  Odd Gleditsch, Sr., who founded Jotun Kemiske Fabrik A/S in 1926.

See also
Norwegian South African

References

Related reading
Kirsten Alsaker Kjerland, Bjørn Enge Bertelsen (2014) Navigating Colonial Orders: Norwegian Entrepreneurship in Africa and Oceania (Berghahn Books)

External links
Photograph of Johan Bryde

1858 births
1925 deaths
People from Larvik
People from Sandefjord
Norwegian people in whaling
Norwegian businesspeople in shipping